Great Falls Downtown Historic District is a national historic district located at Great Falls, Chester County, South Carolina.  The district encompasses 14 contributing buildings in the central business district of Great Falls. They were built between about 1910 and 1930, and consist of the buildings constructed by the Republic Textile Mills Company to provide a commercial area to meet the needs of the mill workers and their families.

It was listed on the National Register of Historic Places in 2000.

References

Commercial buildings on the National Register of Historic Places in South Carolina
Historic districts on the National Register of Historic Places in South Carolina
Buildings and structures in Chester County, South Carolina
National Register of Historic Places in Chester County, South Carolina